Erithalis is a genus of flowering plants in the family Rubiaceae. The genus is found from southern Florida to tropical America.

Species
 Erithalis angustifolia DC.
 Erithalis diffusa Correll
 Erithalis fruticosa L.
 Erithalis harrisii Urb.
 Erithalis odorifera Jacq.
 Erithalis orbiculata (Proctor) A.R.Franck, P.A.Lewis & Oberli
 Erithalis quadrangularis Krug & Urb.
 Erithalis salmeoides Correll
 Erithalis vacciniifolia (Griseb.) C.Wright

References

External links
Erithalis in the World Checklist of Rubiaceae

 
Rubiaceae genera
Taxonomy articles created by Polbot